Shaqir Haruni (born 27 May 1999) is an Albanian footballer who plays as a winger for KF Oriku in the Kategoria e Dytë.

Career

Flamurtari
A graduate of the club's youth academy, Haruni made his league debut for the club on 23 May 2018, coming on as a halftime substitute for Muarem Muarem in a 2-2 away draw with Kukësi.

References

External links
Shaqir Haruni at Eurosport

1999 births
Living people
KF Korabi Peshkopi players
Flamurtari Vlorë players
KF Oriku players
Kategoria Superiore players
Kategoria e Parë players
Albanian footballers
Association football forwards